Bárbara Elizabeth López Pérez (born 13 August 1992), best known as Bárbara López is a Mexican actress best known for her role as Juliana Valdés in the crime drama television series Love to Death (2018–2019). Her other notable TV roles include Lucero Gutiérrez Vega in the Televisa romantic telenovela Un camino hacia el destino (2016), Érika Ballesteros in the telenovela Vino el amor (2016–2017), and María Cruz in the Televisa's comedy telenovela Papá a toda madre (2017–2018) and Dolores in the Pantaya original series Señorita 89. López is the daughter of renowned Mexican producer Reynaldo López.

Filmography

Awards and nominations

References

External links 
 

Living people
People from Monterrey
Mexican telenovela actresses
Mexican film actresses
21st-century Mexican actresses
1992 births